Chess of Life is a 1916 silent film directed by Alexander Uralskiy.

Plot 
The film tells about a woman who morally "degenerates" with the help of love.

Starring 
 Vera Kholodnaya as Inna
 Ivan Perestiani as Baron Kering
 Nikolai Tseretelli as Mark Rudnetskiy
 Nonna Leshinskaya as Mark Rudnetskiy

References 

1916 films
1910s Russian-language films
Russian silent films
Russian black-and-white films
Films of the Russian Empire